Camille de Serres-Rainville (born August 24, 1995) is a Canadian short track speed skater.

She participated at the 2019 World Short Track Speed Skating Championships, winning a medal.

References

External links

1995 births
Living people
Canadian female short track speed skaters
Speed skaters from Montreal
World Short Track Speed Skating Championships medalists
21st-century Canadian women